Lygropia rheumatica is a moth in the family Crambidae. It was described by Edward Meyrick in 1936. It is found in the Democratic Republic of the Congo.

References

Moths described in 1936
Lygropia